Numma Eyns (from German 'Nummer Eins' to English: 'Number One') is the third album by Polish-born German hip hop producer DJ Tomekk. It was released on 16 September 2005 through EMI. Produced by Tomekk, Thomas Schmidt, Mr. Hunter and Bora Kalderim, it features guest appearances from German rappers, such as Harris, Sido, B-Tight and Fler, as well as American musicians, including Khia, Truth Hurts, Blaque, Horace Brown, MC Lyte and Xzibit. The album peaked at number 39 in Germany, number 67 in Austria and number 96 in Switzerland and. It was supported by singles "Salem Aleikum", "Jump, Jump" and "Eey Yo (Eeeeins)" with the latter two were charted.

Track listing 

 Notes

 Track 4 is a cover of "Jump" performed by Kris Kross

Charts

References

External links 
 

2005 albums
Hip hop albums by German artists